Altamira National Forest is a national forest in the state of Pará Brazil.

Location

The Altamira National Forest is in the Amazon biome.
It covers parts of the municipalities of Altamira, Itaituba and Trairão in the state of Pará.
The forest spans the watershed between the Tapajós and the Xingu River.
It contains part of the Curuaés River in the Xingu basin.
The annual plan of 2009 authorized the grant of four forest management units totalling , which were allocated to two companies with contracts expected to last 40 years and to create about 900 formal jobs, 80% of which would be local.

Environment

Vegetation is mostly open rainforest with lianas, but also includes dense submontane rainforest and alluvial forest.
Rapid ecological assessment studies found 212 species of flora in 145 genera.
Endemic fish include Aspidoras poecilus, Microschemobrycon elongatus, Harttia dissidens and Hopliancistrus tricornis. 
Endemic primates include the white-cheeked spider monkey (Ateles marginatus) and the white marmoset (Mico leucippe).

Conservation

The Altamira National Forest was created by decree nº 2.483 of 2 February 1998, and is administered by the Chico Mendes Institute for Biodiversity Conservation (ICMBio).
It is classed as IUCN protected area category VI (protected area with sustainable use of natural resources) with the objective of sustainable multiple use of forest resources and scientific research, with emphasis on methods for sustainable exploitation of native forests.
Protected species include the jaguar (Panthera onca), giant otter (Pteronura brasiliensis) and Amazonian manatee (Trichechus inunguis).

The ecological station is in a region that contains 12 sustainable use conservation areas and 6 fully protected areas.
The fully protected areas, which cover , are the Amazônia, Jamanxim, Rio Novo and Serra do Pardo national parks, the Nascentes da Serra do Cachimbo Biological Reserve and the Terra do Meio Ecological Station.

Notes

Sources

Protected areas of Pará
National forests of Brazil